Félix Sesúmaga Ugarte (12 October 1898 – 24 August 1925) was a Spanish (Basque) footballer who played as a forward for Arenas Club de Getxo, FC Barcelona, Racing de Sama de Langreo, Athletic Bilbao and Spain.

Sesúmaga won the Copa del Rey three times with three different clubs and also played in two back-to-back finals for two different clubs. In 1920 Sesúmaga was a member of the very first Selección that played at the Olympic Games in Antwerp.

Club career
Born in Leioa, Biscay, Sesúmaga began his career in 1914 at neighboring club Getxo Arenas. His goalscoring performances proved crucial to help Arenas reach the Copa del Rey final on two occasions (1917 and 1919). In the 1919 final he scored a hat-trick against FC Barcelona as they won 5–2, contributing decisively to the only Cup title in the history of Arenas, while also becoming in only the third player to manage a hat-trick in a Copa del Rey final after Pichichi in 1915 and Félix Zubizarreta in 1916, both for Athletic Bilbao.

Barcelona were impressed enough to sign him still in 1919 and Sesúmaga didn't lose his goalscoring instinct in Catalonia, helping his new club reach the 1920 and beat Athletic Bilbao 2–0. In doing so, he emulated the feat of the French René Petit, who had also won the Cup two years in a row with different teams. He was a member of a legendary Barcelona team, coached by Jack Greenwell, that also included Paulino Alcántara, Sagibarba, Ricardo Zamora and Josep Samitier. During his time at the club he also helped them win three Championat de Catalunya titles. After a season at Racing de Sama de Langreo, he joined Athletic Bilbao and with them, he managed to win another Copa del Rey, his third, after beating CE Europa 1–0 in the 1923 Copa del Rey Final.

He died from tuberculosis in 1925 at the age of 26.

International career
On 28 August 1920, Sesúmaga went down in history as one of the eleven footballers who played in the first game of the Spain national team at the 1920 Summer Olympics, in an eventual 1–0 victory over Denmark. He didn't play in the quarter-finals against Belgium, and without him, Spain lost 1–3, meaning they would now dispute the silver medal in the repechage tournament, in which he was not side-lined again, featuring in all three games and scoring four goals, netting twice against Italy to give Spain a 2–0 win, and two more against the Netherlands in the play-off for the silver medal as Spain won 3–1. These goals made him the all-time top scorer of the Spain national team until he was overtaken two years later on 30 April 1922 by Paulino Alcántara. In total, he earned eight caps for Spain, scoring four goals between 1920 and 1923.

When he joined Athletic Bilbao in 1922 he became eligible to play for the Biscay autonomous football team representing the local league, and he was a member of the team that participated in the 1922–23 and 1923–24 Prince of Asturias Cup tournaments, an inter-regional competition organized by the RFEF. Biscay was eliminated in the quarter-finals by Asturias in 1922–23, but they achieved revenge in the next edition when they defeated them 4–2 at the same stage (some sources credit Biscay's opening goal to him, but most agree it was scored by Carmelo).

International goals
''Spain score listed first, score column indicates score after each Sesúmaga goal.

Honours
Arenas Club de Getxo
 Copa del Rey: 1919
 Campeonato Norte: 1916–17

FC Barcelona
 Copa del Rey: 1920
 Catalan Championship: 1918–19, 1919–20, 1920–21

Athletic Bilbao
 Copa del Rey: 1923
 Campeonato de Viscaya: 1922–23

Spain
Olympic Games: Silver medallist 1920

References

External links
 La Liga stats
 International stats
 
 

1898 births
1925 deaths
Spanish footballers
Spain international footballers
Footballers from the Basque Country (autonomous community)
La Liga players
Arenas Club de Getxo footballers
FC Barcelona players
Athletic Bilbao footballers
Footballers at the 1920 Summer Olympics
Olympic footballers of Spain
Olympic silver medalists for Spain
Olympic medalists in football
Medalists at the 1920 Summer Olympics
Association football forwards
20th-century deaths from tuberculosis
People from Greater Bilbao
Sportspeople from Biscay
Tuberculosis deaths in Spain